Aeglotis is a genus of moths of the family Crambidae. It contains only one species, Aeglotis argentalis, which is found in Pakistan.

References

Odontiinae
Monotypic moth genera
Moths of Asia
Crambidae genera
Taxa named by Hans Georg Amsel